The isoplanetic patch is defined as an arbitrary area of the sky over which the path length of incoming electromagnetic waves (such as light or radio waves) only varies by a relatively small amount relative to their wavelength. Typically this area is measured by angular size. Poor seeing or a larger telescope aperture will decrease the size of a patch. Thus, the patch size varies inversely with the Fried parameter and the telescope's angular resolution. In order to correct for atmospheric distortion, telescopes fitted with adaptive optics use a bright light source such as a laser to identify the properties of a patch in the area of interest.

See also
 optical resolution

References

Further reading
 Birney S, Gonzalez G, Oesper D  "observational astronomy" second edition, Cambridge university press, 2006

Astronomical imaging
Observational astronomy
Speckle imaging